John Johnson (August 7, 1833 – February 15, 1892) was a member of the Wisconsin State Assembly from York in Dane County and was an Independent Republican. He also served as chairman of the York Town Board.

Johnson was born on August 7, 1833, in Ancram, New York received a public school education, and became a farmer; he came to Wisconsin in 1847 and settled at York, except for a short time spent in Dodge County. He held various town offices, and served as chairman of the town board for five years. In the 1873 general election he received 995 votes, as an Independent Republican candidate, to 936 for Samuel C. Head, the Republican nominee), to represent the 1st Dane County Assembly district (Towns of Albion, Bristol, Cottage Grove, Christiana, Deerfield, Dunkirk, Medina, Pleasant Springs, Sun Prairie and York).

References

External links
 

People from Columbia County, New York
People from Dane County, Wisconsin
Mayors of places in Wisconsin
1833 births
1892 deaths
19th-century American politicians
Republican Party members of the Wisconsin State Assembly